This is the list of banks in Myanmar. There are a total of 31 local banks and 13 foreign branched banks in Myanmar.

Central bank
 Central Bank of Myanmar

State-run banks
 Myanma Agricultural Development Bank
 Myanma Economic Bank
 Myanma Foreign Trade Bank
 Myanma Investment and Commercial Bank

Semi-government banks
 Construction, Housing and Infrastructure Development Bank
 Global Treasure Bank (formerly Myanmar Livestock and Fisheries Development Bank)
 Innwa Bank

 Myawaddy Bank
 Naypyitaw Sibin Bank
 Rural Development Bank
 Yadanabon Bank
 Yangon City Bank

Private banks

 SME-Development Bank
 Asia Green Development Bank
 Ayeyarwady Bank
 Ayeyarwaddy Farmers Development Bank (A Bank)
 Co-operative Bank (CB Bank)
 Myanmar Citizens Bank
 Glory Farmer Development Bank (G Bank)
 Kanbawza Bank
 Myanma Apex Bank
 Mineral Development Bank (Public Company Limited)
 Myanmar Microfinance Bank
 Myanmar Oriental Bank
 Myanma Tourism Bank
 Shwe Rural and Urban Development Bank (Shwe Bank)
 Tun Commercial Bank (formerly Tun Foundation Bank)
 uab bank
 Yoma Bank
 First Private Bank

Foreign banks
(notified by Central Bank of Myanmar)
 State Bank of India
 MUFG Bank
 Sumitomo Mitsui Banking Corporation
 OCBC Bank
 United Overseas Bank
 Bangkok Bank
 Industrial and Commercial Bank of China
 Maybank
 Mizuho Bank
 Australia and New Zealand Banking Group
 Bank for Investment and Development of Vietnam (BIDV)
 Shinhan Bank
 E.SUN Commercial Bank

See also 
 Central Bank of Myanmar

References

External links
Central Bank of Myanmar's List of Private Banks

Myanmar
Lists of companies of Myanmar
Myanmar